New York Hilton is an album by pianist Hilton Ruiz recorded in 1977 and released on the Danish label, SteepleChase.

Track listing 
All compositions by Hilton Ruiz except where noted.
 "Blues for Mary Lou" – 7:28
 "Vierd Lullaby" (Babs Gonzales) – 6:22
 "Midtown Madness" – 4:22
 "African Ripples" (Fats Waller) – 6:37
 "Libertad Ahorra" (Kiane Zawadi) – 5:19
 "New York Hilton" – 7:14
 "Stepping into Beauty" (Rahsaan Roland Kirk) – 7:08 Additional track on CD

Personnel 
Hilton Ruiz – piano
Hakim Jami – bass
Steve Solder – drums

References 

Hilton Ruiz albums
1978 albums
SteepleChase Records albums